Misaskim‎ is an American Orthodox Jewish not-for-profit organization that provides services for the care of the dead and the needs and conveniences of mourners in accordance to Jewish law and custom. Misaskim provides moral support and bereavement assistance to individuals or families, while safeguarding the dignity of the deceased. They assist the bereaved by providing free shiva-related  social links and lending religious articles. One noteworthy item is their door signs, noting please do not visit earlier than/later than.

History
Misaskim was founded in Brooklyn in 2004 by a group of Hatzalah (volunteer ambulance) members and other community activists who perceived the need to help families during the painful time when a loved one dies.  The small group decided to set up an organization with a twenty-four-hour hotline. They named it Misaskim, which is the Ashkenazi pronunciation of a Hebrew word which means 'attendants', a term used for members of a Chevra Kadisha (Jewish burial society). Over time, additional programs and projects were added to Misaskim's original services of helping the bereaved.

Misaskim is directed by Yankie (Jack) Meyer, one of the organization's founders, and Meir Weill.

Services 
During major catastrophes or accidents with Jewish casualties, Misaskim dispatches a team of volunteers to any location in the United States on a moment’s notice.
Misaskim’s mourners' services ensure that the week of shiva (mourning) is a little bit more comforting and comfortable by providing aveilim (mourners) with necessities, from low chairs to Torah scrolls, from folding beds to fax machines.

Care for the dead
Misaskim safeguards the dignity of the deceased by advocating to prevent autopsies and/or cremation, and educating government officials and coroners regarding respect to the Jewish departed.

Mourner's needs
Misaskim provides items needed for observing Shiva after the death of an immediate family member. They provide low chairs, Siddurim, Sefer Torah, folding chairs, guide to the customs of Shiva, and many other items needed. They deliver these items free of charge.

Crisis relief
When disaster or tragedy strikes, Misaskim deals with the situation in a professional, efficient manner that is acceptable to the law and respectful to the deceased. Trained volunteers clear crime scenes upon request by local law enforcement, find burial plots and arrange for the funeral, when necessary, and assists other Hebrew burial societies, providing sound systems, generator-powered lights for nighttime burials and solving many logistical problems in order to arrange a funeral in a timely manner.

Other services 
Misaskim reaches out to the orphans of the recently deceased with a plethora of age-appropriate services, trips, gifts, and counseling, when necessary.

Relationships with other organizations

In 2007, ZAKA announced cooperation with Misaskim, effectively making Misaskim the American branch of the Israeli organization.

See also
Chevra kadisha

References

External links
Misaskim Official Website
 

2004 in Judaism
2004 establishments in New York City
Bereavement in Judaism
Jewish charities based in the United States
Jews and Judaism in New York City
Non-profit organizations based in Brooklyn
Organizations established in 2004
Volunteer organizations in the United States